Le Chakka (Bengali:লে ছক্কা) is a 2010 Bengali-language sports comedy film written by Padmanava Dasgupta and directed by Raj Chakraborty. The film stars Payel Sarkar and Dev as the lead pair of the film withsupporting roles by Kharaj Mukherjee, Ritwick Chakraborty, Biswajit Chakraborty, Aritra Dutta Banik, Deepankar De, Laboni Sarkar, Biswanath Basu, Debjani Chattopadhyay and Padmanava Dasgupta. The film's score and soundtrack were composed by Indraadip Das Gupta.  It is a remake of the Tamil movie Chennai 600028.

Plot 
11 Bullets is a very bad cricket team of North Kolkata. The team is formed with the people of the locality, who have various professions. The film starts with a match between 11 bullets and a cricket team of South Kolkata. The hero, named Abir, alone smashes 11 bullets. The team members of 11 bullets are then abused by the people of their locality. In the meantime, Abir comes with his family to stay at Dorjipara, which is the locality of 11 bullets. But, due to huge cultural deference between North Kolkata and South Kolkata, Abir becomes irritated to stay over there. The niece of the landlord of Abir's tenant house, stars having regular quarrels with Abir. Then, Abir discovers that a political leader is trying to grab Dorjipara, and for that, the leader wants the tenant house, which the landlord doesn't want to sell. When Abir teaches the 11 Bullets people, that without protesting against these political evils, they will not be able to survive, slowly, those people come close to Abir, and vice versa. Then slowly, Abir gets intimate with Rani, which her brother Rajat doesn't like. A Person, Shankar, who is attached to that leader comes and gets involved with the unmarried, frustrated, elder sister of Rani, named Ratna. But, when Shankar says that, he wants to marry Rani, not Ratna. Then Ratna kills herself. Ultimately, when the party leaders come to take control over Dorjipara, Abir throws a challenge of a cricket match, which is going to decide, who's going to get control over the house. 11 Bullets have a tensed and marvelous win, and Abir has a romantic win over Rani.

Cast 
Dev as Abir
Payel Sarkar as Rani
 Kharaj Mukherjee as Ismail Biriyaniola
 Biswanath Basu as Gour
 Biswajit Chakraborty as Abir's father
 Laboni Sarkar as Abir's mother
 Deepankar De as Maniranjan Mitra, Rani's uncle
 Debjani Chattopadhyay as Ratna, Rani's elder sister
 Supriyo Dutta as Rani's father
 Ritwick Chakraborty as Rajat, Rani's brother
 Abhimanyu Mukherjee as commentator
 Aritra Dutta Banik as special appearance
 Sanghasri Sinha as Chilim
 Prasun Gain as Abir's friend
 Parthasarathi Chattopadhyay as Kanu
 Raju Majumdar as Abir's friend
 Vashcar Deb as Abir's friend
 Debranjan Nag as Abir's friend
 Arindam Dutta as Shankar
 Anindya Pulak Banerjee
 Raju Dutta
 Tapan Chattopadhyay
 Padmanava Dasgupta
 Rupak Dey

Soundtrack 

The film score of the film as well as the soundtrack was scored by Indraadip Das Gupta. The soundtrack, featuring 5 tracks overall, was released on 14 May 2010 in India. The lyrics were written by Priyo Chattopadhyay, Prasenjit Mukherjee and Srijit Mukherjee.

References

External links
 

2010 films
2010s Bengali-language films
Bengali-language Indian films
Films about cricket in India
Indian sports comedy films
Films scored by Indradeep Dasgupta
Films set in Kolkata
Bengali remakes of Tamil films
2010s sports comedy films
Films directed by Raj Chakraborty
2010 comedy films
Indian sports films